The Digging Leviathan is a science fiction novel by American writer James P. Blaylock. It was first published in 1984 by Ace Books. The source was Blaylock's first novel The Chinese Circus, which was never finished.

Plot summary

The story is set in 1964 in and around Los Angeles, California.  Jim Hastings is a young boy who lives with his uncle, Edward St. Ives; Jim's father suffered a nervous breakdown upon his wife's death and has been institutionalized ever since.  Jim is increasingly puzzled by a series of strange events that seem to happen around his friend Giles "Gill" Peach who, like his father and forefathers before him, has gills.  The boys are fascinated by pulp science fiction, and Gill begins building a device inspired by the "subterranean prospector" described in Edgar Rice Burroughs' novel At the Earth's Core.

Jim's father William, who periodically escapes the psychiatric facility run by Hilario Frosticos, is convinced that Gill is being manipulated by unscrupulous adventurers allied with Frosticos: a hollow earth conspiracy. This is discounted as paranoia by St. Ives, Russell Latzarel, Roycroft Squires, and William Ashbless, all members of the Newtonian Society, an alternative science-oriented social club.  However, as events unfold it appears that William's worst fears have a bizarre truth behind them, and the ideas described in Gill's diaries are more than weird tales.

Clues found by William lead St. Ives and Latzarel to sewers connected to an underground river, mermen, bizarre technology, and a longevity serum based on carp.  Together with Jim, the four men try to outmaneuver Frosticos in the race to reach a not-quite unimaginable goal.

Reception
Blaylock said about the novel:

References

External links

Fantastic Fiction
Amazon.com
Babbage Press  - Reviews written by public readers of the book.
Library Thing

1984 American novels
American science fiction novels
Fiction set in 1964
Novels set in Los Angeles
Ace Books books